Steve Faulk (born June 1, 1947) is an American former professional tennis player.

Faulk, a New Orleans native, played collegiate tennis for Louisiana State University and was SEC champion at No. 1 singles in 1970. He was a three-time first team All-SEC and in 1970 became the first LSU player to be an All-American. 

Active on the professional tour in the 1970s, Faulk featured in singles main draws at the French Open and US Open, as well as in doubles at Wimbledon. He was runner-up to Onny Parun at the Auckland tennis championship in 1972.

References

External links
 
 

1947 births
Living people
American male tennis players
LSU Tigers tennis players
Tennis people from Louisiana
Sportspeople from New Orleans